Norman Cush (4 October 1911 – 22 January 1983) was an Australian cricketer. He played one first-class match for New South Wales in 1934/35.

See also
 List of New South Wales representative cricketers

References

External links
 

1911 births
1983 deaths
Australian cricketers
New South Wales cricketers
Cricketers from Sydney